Chic-ism is the eighth studio album by American R&B band Chic, released on the Warner Bros label in 1992.

The album includes singles "Chic Mystique" (#1 US Club Play, #48 R&B) and "Your Love" (#3 US Club Play). Nine years after Chic's final 1983 album Believer, during which Nile Rodgers and Bernard Edwards had worked as songwriters and producers for artists such as David Bowie, Madonna, Duran Duran, Robert Palmer, and The B-52's, and the Chic back catalogue and its musical legacy had been re-evaluated by both music critics and the general public, Edwards and Rodgers reunited for a long-awaited eighth Chic album and the following years would see the two touring the world with their new line-up of the band.

Chic-ism was digitally remastered and re-issued by Wounded Bird Records in 2006.

Track listing
All songs written by Nile Rodgers and Bernard Edwards except as indicated.
"Chic Mystique" – 6:27 (Nile Rodgers/Bernard Edwards/Princesa) 
"Your Love" – 5 :54 
"Jusagroove" – 3:41
"Something You Can Feel" – 4:31 (Nile Rodgers/Bernard Edwards/Princesa)
"One and Only One" – 4:27
"Doin' That Thing to Me" – 4:05
"Chicism" – 4:06 (Nile Rodgers/Bernard Edwards/Princesa)
"In It to Win It" – 5:45
"My Love's for Real" – 4:52
"Take My Love" – 5:36
"High" – 4:29
"M.M.F.T.C.F." – 4:36
"Chic Mystique (Reprise)" – 4:05 (Nile Rodgers/Bernard Edwards/Princesa)

Personnel

 Sylver Logan Sharp – lead vocals (tracks 1, 2, 3, 5, 7, 8, 9, 11, 13)
 Jenn Thomas – lead vocals (tracks 1, 3, 6, 7, 8, 10, 11, 13)
 Princessa (Jennece S. Moore) – lead vocals/rap (tracks 1, 4, 7, 13)
 Tawatha Agee – vocals
 Briz – vocals
 Michelle Cobbs – vocals
 Dennis Collins – vocals
 Fonzi Thornton – vocals
 Brenda White King – vocals
 Nile Rodgers – guitar, vocals
 Richard Hilton – keyboards, programming
 Andreas Levin – programming
 Bernard Edwards – bass guitar, vocals
 Sterling Campbell – drums
 Sonny Emory – drums
 Geraldo Velez – percussion
 Stan Harrison – alto & tenor saxophone
 Steve Elson – alto, tenor & baritone saxophone
 Mac Gollehon – trumpet, flugelhorn, piccolo trumpet
 Alfred Brown – strings
 Elena Barere – strings
 Fred Zlotkin – strings
 Gerald Tarack – strings
 Julien Barber – strings
 Juliet Haffner – strings
 Marti Sweet – strings
 Matthew Raimondi – strings
 Max Ellen – strings
 Mitsue Takayama – strings
 Regis Iandiorio – strings
 Richard Locker – strings
 Richard Sortomme – strings
 Winterton Garvey – strings
 Gene Orloff – conductor (strings)

Production
 Bernard Edwards – producer
 Nile Rodgers – producer
 Bob Ludwig – mastering
 Dave O'Donell – mixing
 Jon Goldberger – mixing
 Jeff Gold, Robin Lynch – art direction and design
 Stéphane Sednaoui – photography

Charts

References

1992 albums
Chic (band) albums
Albums produced by Nile Rodgers
Albums produced by Bernard Edwards
Warner Records albums